Hyperthaema punctata is a moth of the subfamily Arctiinae. It was described by Rothschild in 1935. It is found in Venezuela and French Guiana.

References

 

Phaegopterina
Moths described in 1935